Blow Job  is a 1980 Italian film directed by Alberto Cavallone.

Production
Director Alberto Cavallone was known for his films that combined eroticism, and experimental film styles.
By the late 1970s, Cavallone had transitioned between erotic films and hardcore pornography. Cavallone described the film as a "deliberately pornographic film, but with political content. A movie about violence as a means of communication and knowledge in a repressive society." Blow Job (Soffio erotico) was officially announced as a production by Martial Boschero's company Anna Cinematografica but was actually produced by Pietro Belpedio's company Distribuzione Cinematografica 513.

The film was shot in August 1979 with the working title La strega nuda. Cavallone stated that the film did not feature any graphic sex, except for a simulated instance oral sex. However, other people involved in its making refuted the claim. A hardcore version of the film was shot with the same cast, also featuring three uncredited performers who would work with Cavallone again in his hardcore films, including Pauline Teutscher, Guya Lauri Filzi, and Hassan Jabar.

Release
The film was first rejected by the rating board on February 23, 1980 after Cavallone refused to put any cuts in the film that have been requested.' In May 1980, Cavallone obliged to cut the film and it was given a V.M. 18 rating, on the condition that the film was given the subtitle Soffio Erotico which the board assumed was the contextual and faithful translation of "Blow Job" into Italian. Blow Job (Soffio Erotico) was distributed theatrically in Italy by Distribuzione Cinematografica 513 on May 17, 1980. The film grossed a total of 426,371,000 Italian lire domestically in Italy.

References

Footnotes

Sources

External links
 

Italian horror films
Italian mystery drama films
1980s Italian films